Buenavista de Cañedo, officially Buenavista, is a town in the municipality of San Martín de Hidalgo in the state of Jalisco, Mexico. It has a population of 2,001 inhabitants.

References

External links
Buenavista at PueblosAmerica.com

Populated places in Jalisco